Strahan is a surname. Notable people with the surname include:

Art Strahan (born 1943), American football player for the Houston Oilers, Atlanta Falcons, and Orlando Panthers
Frank Strahan (born 1886), Australian public servant
Freddie Strahan (born 1938), Shelbourne F.C football player 1960-1973
Major Sir George Strahan (1838–1887), British colonial administrator and Governor of Tasmania (1881–1886)
 Colonel George Strahan (1839–1911), British army engineer and surveyor in India
John Strahan, architect working in Bristol and Somerset around 1750
Jonathan Strahan (born 1964), Australian editor and critic
Michael Strahan (born 1971), American football player for the New York Giants and media personality
Philip Strahan, American economist
Reuben S. Strahan (1835–1895), American politician and judge in Oregon
Ronald Strahan (1922–2010), Australian zoologist
Sam Strahan (1944–2019), New Zealand rugby union player
William Strahan (publisher) (1715–1785), former Printer To The King

See also
Strachan